The Centennial Memorial Samsung Hall was completed in commemoration of Korea University's centennial. It houses a digital library and a number of national treasure-level properties of the Korea University Museum. The building was completed on a site of 21,000m².

See also 
Korea University Museum

References

External links 
cdl.korea.ac.kr

Korea University
Buildings and structures in Seoul